Dong Cheng Wei is a Taiwanese rock band. It was an underground band that was formed during the band members' high school years. It gain certained amount of popularity because of the success of the lead vocal, Jiro Wang and the TV appearances on KO One, The X-Family, K.O.3an Guo, KO One Return, KO One Re-act, The X-Dormitory, Angel 'N' Devil and KO ONE: RE-MEMBER.

Television appearance

Biography 
The name of the band had changed 3 times. Karma was the original name. DJ-WIS was a name taken from the first letter of the band members' English names: "DJ-WIS" (Dun, Jiro, Will, Iyhon, Shu). In between their active years, the band once disbanded due to various reasons: Jiro Wang's throat problem and his busy schedule of filming, band members continue with their studying in school, etc. But the band reunited of filming The X-Family. Shu Chen also composed some songs in The X-Family OST.

The current band title is a dedication of saying "Dong Cheng's Band" ('Dong Cheng' is Jiro Wang's Chinese name).

The Band disbanded in 2020 as announced by the leader Shu Chen.

Band Members 
Shu Chen (陳德修)
Ming Lee (李明翰)
Free Dun (鄧樺敦)
Vike Chen (陳志介)
Jiro Wang（汪東城）
R Chord (謝和弦) 
Hui Min Feifei

Music 
The band composed a song called "人間逃亡記" during the Karma era, lyrics by Jiro Wang.

External links 
 Dong Cheng Wei OFFICIAL Facebook Fanpage.
 Jiro Wang's Blog
 Iyhon Chen's Blog
 Ming Li's Blog
 Shu Chen's Blog
 Dun Deng's Blog

Mandopop musical groups
Taiwanese rock music groups